Enrique Cepeda is a paralympic athlete from Cuba competing mainly in category F12 long and triple jump events.

Biography
Enrique has competed in three Paralympics winning medals at each games.  His first games were in 1992 where as well as competing in the 200m and long jump he won a bronze in the 100m and gold in the triple jump.  After missing the 1996 games he returned in 2000 in Sydney competing in the 100m and winning a gold medal in the F13 long jump.  He followed this up in 2004 with competing in both the long and triple jump and assisting the Cuban T11-13 4 × 100 m to a silver medal.

References

Paralympic athletes of Cuba
Athletes (track and field) at the 1992 Summer Paralympics
Athletes (track and field) at the 2000 Summer Paralympics
Athletes (track and field) at the 2004 Summer Paralympics
Paralympic gold medalists for Cuba
Paralympic silver medalists for Cuba
Paralympic bronze medalists for Cuba
Living people
Medalists at the 1992 Summer Paralympics
Medalists at the 2000 Summer Paralympics
Medalists at the 2004 Summer Paralympics
Year of birth missing (living people)
Paralympic medalists in athletics (track and field)
Cuban male sprinters
Cuban male long jumpers
Cuban male triple jumpers
Visually impaired sprinters
Visually impaired long jumpers
Visually impaired triple jumpers
Paralympic sprinters
Paralympic long jumpers
Paralympic triple jumpers
20th-century Cuban people